The Ministry of Health of the Republic of Serbia is the ministry in the Government of Serbia which is in the charge of healthcare. The current minister is Danica Grujičić, in office since 26 October 2022.

History
The Ministry was established on 11 February 1991.

Subordinate institutions
There are several agencies and institutions that operate within the scope of the Ministry:
 Republic Health Insurance Fund
 Agency for Accreditation of Health Institutions
 Medicines and Medical Devices Agency of Serbia
 Health institutions

List of ministers
Political Party:

See also
 Healthcare in Serbia
 List of hospitals in Serbia

References

External links
 
 Serbian ministries, etc. – Rulers.org

Health
1991 establishments in Serbia
Ministries established in 1991
Serbia